"Parle-moi" is a 2000 song recorded by the Canadian pop singer Isabelle Boulay. It was the first single from her fourth album Mieux qu'ici-bas, on which it features as the first track. Released in October 2000, this pop song/ballad achieved a great success in France and Belgium (Wallonia), reaching the highest positions on the charts.

Song information
The song deals with a love relationship that comes to its end.

Isabelle Boulay performed the song during her 2002 and 2005 concerts, and thus it was available on her live albums Au moment d'être à vous (tenth track) and Du Temps pour toi (third track). The song was also included on the compilations Les Plus Belles Victoires de la Musique, Hits France 2001 and Hits 2001.

The song was covered by the Italian artist Claude Barzotti on the 2003 compilation Retour gagnant (sixth track). In 2006, the song was performed by Isabelle Boulay and Les 500 Choristes in a live version included on the album 500 Choristes vol. 2 as seventh track.

Chart performances
In France, the single started at number eight on the Singles Chart on 14 October 2000. It reached number two for two non-consecutive weeks and totaled 12 weeks in the top ten. Then it did not stop to drop and featured for 22 weeks in the top 50 and 24 weeks in the top 100. The single was certified Gold disc by the SNEP and ranked 20th on the End of the Year Chart.

"Parle-moi" charted for 22 weeks on the Ultratop 40, the Belgian (Wallonia) Singles Chart. It went to number 28 on 18 November 2000, climbed to number eight and topped the chart two weeks later. Then it spent three weeks at number two, three weeks at number three and two weeks at number four. It dropped rather slowly and remained for a total of 13 weeks in the top ten and 22 weeks on the chart. It was 66th and 35th on the 2000 and 2001 Annual Charts.

"Parle-moi" is Boulay's most successful single in terms of sales and peak positions.

Track listings
 CD single
 "Parle-moi" – 3:49
 "Je n'voudrais pas t'aimer" – 4:11

 Digital download
 "Parle-moi" – 3:49
 "Parle-moi" (live) – 3:43

Charts and sales

Peak positions

Year-end charts

Certifications

References

External links
 "Parle-moi", lyrics + music video

2000 singles
Isabelle Boulay songs
Ultratop 50 Singles (Wallonia) number-one singles
Pop ballads
V2 Records singles
2000 songs